"Stakker Humanoid" is an 1988 track by Humanoid released in 1988 on the London-based label Westside Records. It is described  by The Guardian as "the first truly credible UK acid techno record to break into the mainstream."

History
The project behind the track started out with Stakker, a collaborative project by the video artists Mark McClean and Colin Scott. They needed music to support their video and contacted Brian Dougans. 
They sent a demo video tape containing graphics and some music to Morgan Khan who (although he didn't appreciate the video) invited Brian Dougans to record two demos at his Dance Studios in Ealing London. The sample "Humanoid", taken from the video game Berzerk, provided the name of the track.

The track was originally called "Humanoid" to be put out by Stakker through Morgan Khan's label Westside Records, though Morgan released it as "Stakker Humanoid" by 'Humanoid' to avoid copyright issues. A dispute had arisen between Brian Dougans and Colin Scott / Mark McClean and before the record was in the shops, Stakker and Brian Dougans split, ending their working relationship which had lasted just over a year. However, McClean and Dougans were to continue working together on the Future Sound of London project.

The track was a hit not just at influential clubs like Shoom in London, but was championed by mainstream stalwarts like radio DJ Bruno Brookes and producer Pete Waterman. It went on to reach number 17 on the UK charts in November 1988, leading to Dougans' appearance on Top of the Pops on 1 December 1988. In 2011, Noel Gallagher said of the track:

Mixes
The soundtrack for the 1989 release Eurotechno (originally written by Dougans) was remixed and overdubbed with new sections added by Colin Scott and Simon Monday in the digital studio that Scott and McClean had set up in the Goldcrest building in Great Pultney Street in Soho. This soundtrack is on the Eurotechno video and on the CD later released by Rephlex Records.

Track listings

Original 12" and CD release
A1 - "Stakker Humanoid" (4:59)
A2 - "Stakker Humanoid" (Radio Edit) (3:40)
B  - "Stakker Humanoid" (The Omen Mix) (7:50)

Original 7" release
A - "Stakker Humanoid" (3:40)
B - "Stakker Humanoid" (Part 2) (4:40)

Stakker Humanoid '92
 "Stakker Humanoid" (7" Original) (3:40) 
 "Stakker Humanoid" (Smart Systems Remix) (4:52) 
 Remix - Smart Systems  
 "Stakker Humanoid" (Gary Cobain '94 Mix) (5:41) 
 Remix - Garry Cobain  
 "Stakker Humanoid" (Omen Mix) (7:36) 
 "Stakker Humanoid" (303 Tribe) (5:31) 
 Remix - The Future Sound of London
 "Stakker Humanoid" (Outer Limits) (4:51) 
 Remix - The Future Sound of London
 "Stakker Humanoid" (12" Original) (4:55) 
 "Stakker Humanoid" (Dub Drums) (2:43) 
 Remix - The Future Sound of London

Chart positions

Personnel
 Composed by Brian Dougans
 Engineered by John Laker
 Produced and mixed by Brian Dougans, John Laker
 Uses vocal samples from the videogame 'Berzerk'.

References

Sources
 Cavanagh, David. The Creation Records Story: My Magpie Eyes Are Hungry for the Prize. London: Virgin Books, 2000.

External links
 Footage at the Hitman and Her
 

1988 debut singles
British house music songs
Rephlex Records singles
1988 songs
Acid house songs